Our Lady Queen of the Missions School is a higher secondary school in Kolkata, West Bengal, India.  The school was established on 1 August 1946 by the Congregation of Our Lady of the Missions at 34 Syed Amir Ali Avenue, Kolkata - 700 017 as Secondary  school. Higher secondary was added at the Salt Lake campus. The foundation stone of the school at Salt Lake was laid on 9 February 1997 and started functioning in April 2001. It is affiliated to the Council for the Indian School Certificate Examinations board.

References 

Primary schools in West Bengal
High schools and secondary schools in West Bengal
Girls' schools in Kolkata
Christian schools in West Bengal
Catholic schools in India
Educational institutions established in 1946
1946 establishments in India